Brogan is an Irish surname.

Brogan may also refer to:

Brogan (shoes)
Brogan, Oregon, unincorporated community in Oregon, USA
Brogan Group
Saint Brogan